In West Slavic countries, as well as in Belarus, fermented cereals, such as rye, wheat, or oatmeal, are used to make soups. In Poland and parts of Belarus, rye is traditional for making żur; a variant made with wheat flour instead of rye is known in Poland as barszcz biały ("white barszcz"). Fermented oatmeal is a common ingredient in Belarus and in some regions of Poland. Fermented wheat or sourdough soups are also found in other western Slavic cuisines, in particular in the Slovak (kyslovka), Silesian (Sauermehlsuppe) and Czech (kyselo) cuisines.

Poland

Żur (diminutive: żurek) is a soup made of soured rye flour (akin to sourdough) and meat (usually boiled pork sausage or pieces of smoked sausage, bacon or ham).

The recipe varies regionally. In Poland it is sometimes served in an edible bowl made of bread or with boiled potatoes. In Silesia, a type of sour rye soup known as żur śląski is served in a bowl, poured over mashed potatoes. In the Podlaskie region, it is common to eat żurek with halved hard-boiled eggs.  In Polish Subcarpathia, there is a traditional variety made of fermented oatmeal ( or kisełycia). In Poland żurek is traditionally eaten at Easter, but is also popular during other parts of the year. It is sometimes flavored with bits of sausage, usually eaten with bread or buns.

Belarus
In Belarus, žur or  kisjalica is a soup made of fermented oatmeal or rye. Žur may also denote a thicker porridge, a type of kissel made of fermented oatmeal, which is known since the times of Kievan Rus'.

Czech Republic

Kyselo is a soup based on sourdough and mushrooms.  It is a traditional Czech cuisine from poor folk food originating in the Northern Bohemia mountain region of Krkonoše.  It is very substantial and it contains an abundance of proteins, B vitamins, dietary fiber and other important nutrients.

Origin
Kyselo has been a traditional daily food of poor people in the Krkonoše mountain region for centuries, primarily in the winter.  It is made from locally accessible, cheap, storable ingredients (the mushrooms are usually used dried) and nutritious ingredients so it provides substantial energy for hard mountain life and work.  Historically kyselo was made without eggs.  Eggs in early times were produced mainly for sale on the market, not for one's own family, so eggs were only eaten on some holidays.  Potatoes became widespread among poor people of Czech lands in the late 18th century, so before that time soups of this type were also made without potatoes.

Usage of sourdough indicates that kyselo has ancient origins, probably in medieval (and prehistoric) fermented cereal porridges. The Krkonoše region is on the Czech–Polish border, and kyselo is a close relative of the Polish sour rye soup.

Etymology
The word kyselo is derived from the word kyselý, which means 'sour' in Czech.  The sourdough which kyselo is made from is called "chlebový kvásek" or "chlebový kvas" (not to be confused with the Russian kvass).

Sometimes another sour mushroom-based Czech soup kulajda or its variants are mistakenly called kyselo.  The difference is that kulajda and similar soups do not use sourdough but sour cream or milk and vinegar.  To reduce this misunderstanding, kyselo is often called Krkonošské kyselo ("Kyselo of Krkonoše").

In Eastern regions of the Czech Republic and in Slovakia there is a soup called kyselica, but it is a variation of sauerkraut soup.

Ingredients and preparation
The basis of kyselo is strong broth made from mushrooms and caraway in water. Central European mushroom species such as cep and similar ones are used. The mushrooms are usually used dried in the winter. The broth is thickened by sourdough which should ideally be made from rye flour. Families in Krkonoše usually grew their own sourdough for years in special cookware called "kyselák" or "kvasák". The thickened broth is supplemented by onion sautéed in butter, boiled and then roasted potatoes and scrambled eggs and seasoned with salt and vinegar. Due to its ancient origins, kyselo has no fixed recipe, and the preparation is a little different in every family. The recipe is passed on by oral tradition. There are local variants of kyselo in Krkonoše: without eggs or with hard-boiled eggs, boiled but not roasted potatoes, with or without cream, etc.

Nowadays one can purchase an industry-made instant powder kyselo base for use in big canteens or liquid fermented cereal 

Following ingredients may be used:
 cured bones 
 pork ribs 
 weisswurst 
 pork belly 
 onion 
 potatoes 
 carrots 
 celery 
 parsley 
 marjoram 
 bay leaves 
 allspice 
 lovage 
 caraway
 garlic 
 mushrooms 
 cream 
 horseradish 
 eggs to serve 
 rye wholemeal bread croutons

Serving
Kyselo is traditionally served hot in a soup plate or bowl.  In some restaurants it is served in an edible bread bowl.  Sometimes it is garnished with chopped scallion, parsley or other green herbs.  The soup is eaten with a tablespoon.  The potatoes are often served on a special plate (one for the whole table) and everyone can add any quantity as needed.  Usually salt and vinegar are also on the table for personal seasoning preferences.

Kyselo is a very nutritious food so it is often served as a main (and only) course, but in small quantities it could be also served as an entrée.

Folklore and popular culture
As a staple food, kyselo plays an important part in local legends and fairy tales, especially in connection to the mythical mountain lord Krakonoš.  It is said that he gave sourdough to people and invented kyselo.  In Krkonoše there is also a mountain named Kotel which means cauldron.  When fog rises from the valley at bottom of Kotel, people say that Krakonoš is cooking the kyselo.

The name kyselo is well-known throughout the Czech Republic because of Večerníček children's television series Krkonošské pohádky (Fairy Tales from Krkonoše), in which Anče, one of the main characters, cooks kyselo in almost all of the episodes.

Similar dishes
Eastern European cuisines also have variations of soups based on soured flour or other modes of fermentation. Examples are Russian okroshka made with kvass, Romanian borș made of fermented wheat or barley bran, and Finnish hapanvelli soup is made with pea and sour dough. More distant relative is Japanese miso soup, which also uses a fermented basic ingredient – miso paste.

See also

 List of soups

References

Belarusian cuisine
Polish soups
Easter food
Slavic cuisine
Slovak soups
Czech cuisine
Rye-based dishes
National dishes
Vegetarian cuisine